This is a list of Slovenian football transfers for the summer in 2016–17. Only moves from Slovenian PrvaLiga are listed.

The summer transfer window began in June/July 2016. The window closed in August/September 2016.

Slovenian PrvaLiga

Aluminij

In:

Out:

Celje

In:

Out:

Domžale

In:

Out:

Gorica

In:

Out:

Koper

In:

Out:

Krško

In:

Out:

Maribor

In:

Out:

Olimpija

In:

Out:

Radomlje

In:

Out:

Rudar

In:

Out:

References

Slovenian PrvaLiga
transfers
Lists of Slovenian football transfers